Sofia Sula (born 27 December 2002) is a former competitive Finnish figure skater. She lives in Torino, Italy.

On the junior level, she is a two-time Nordics silver medalist (2017, 2018), and a two-time Finnish junior national champion (2017, 2018).

Career
Her coaches were Italian Edoardo De Bernardis and Claudia Masoero. Sula practiced at Ice Club Torino in Italy. Her choreographer was Italian Edoardo De Bernardis.

Sula started her skating career in 2007 in Mäntsälä, Finland.

Sula was part of Finnish Figure Skating Association national team.

Programs

Competitive highlights

Track record

Sula performed in Les Stars de la Glace show with Florent Amodio, Miki Ando and Philippe Candeloro at Christmas 2017 in Vaujany, France.

References

Finnish female single skaters
2002 births
Living people
Finnish expatriate sportspeople in Italy
Sportspeople from Lahti